The Nottingham derby is the name given to football matches contested between Nottingham Forest and Notts County.

History
The two clubs are amongst the oldest football clubs in the World. County were formed in 1862 and are the oldest professional association football club in the world. Forest were formed three years later by a group of men playing the now largely unknown sport of bandy.

The first meeting between the two clubs was a friendly on 22 March 1866. The match was a 0–0 draw and was probably on the Forest Recreation Ground.

The first competitive meeting in the FA Cup came on 16 November 1878 and resulted in a 3–1 victory for Nottingham Forest. The first league game occurred on 8 October 1892 and resulted in a 3–1 victory for Notts County.

The last league Nottingham derby occurred on 12 February 1994 and resulted in a 2–1 victory for Notts County. Charlie Palmer (or 'Sir' Charlie Palmer as he has been dubbed by Notts County fans) scored with just four minutes remaining and only ninety seconds after Forest had equalised. The date, 12 February, is now known to local fans as Charlie Palmer Day.

The rivalry was resurrected on 9 August 2011, when the clubs met in the first round of the Football League Cup at the City Ground, with Forest winning a penalty shootout after the match had ended 3–3.

The two clubs rarely meet as they are in different tiers of the league system and supporters generally view other regional clubs as more prominent rivals. However, recent years have seen incidents of trouble between supporters. In 2007, a 'friendly' match between the clubs saw violence erupt after the final whistle. And in 2017, several followers of both sides were convicted of taking part in a prearranged mass brawl in a pub in Nottingham. Another friendly match the previous summer also saw four arrests. Trouble broke out once again at a pre-season 'friendly' in July 2022, with fighting between fans and stewards in the stands spilling on to the pitch. The game ended in a 2–2 draw.

Statistics

The two clubs have met a total of 94 times in the League, FA Cup and League Cup. The two sides have contested games in a number of other competitions including the Nottinghamshire County Senior Cup and the Anglo-Italian Cup. The results and statistics from those games are not included below.

League

Notts County in the league at home

Nottingham Forest in the league at home

Cup matches

References

External links
Violence mars 'friendly' match between city rivals
Nottingham derby head-to-head 
British Pathé footage from a Nottingham derby, 1953

England football derbies
Nottingham Forest F.C.
Notts County F.C.
Sport in Nottingham